

Local coverage

1983

1984

1985

National coverage
On December 9, 1982, the USFL and ABC Radio Networks jointly announced that ABC would do 39 national broadcasts of USFL games, including two playoff games and the league's championship game. ABC agreed to cover two games per week during regular season.

For the Saturday night package in 1983, Shelby Whitefield, Ron Menchine and Steve Grad for the commentators. Other announcers for ABC Radio's USFL coverage included:
Bob Buck (play-by-play)
Dick Butkus (color commentary)
Don Chevrier (play-by-play, beginning in 1984)
Johnny Holliday (play-by-play, beginning in 1984)
Paul Hornung (color commentary)
Marv Levy (color commentary)
Dan Lovett (color commentary)
Fred Manfra (play-by-play)
Craig Morton (color commentary)

For the playoff semi finals in 1984, Johnny Holliday and Paul Hornung called Los Angeles/Arizona game on Saturday while Fred Manfra and Dan Lovett called the Birmingham/Philadelphia game. Meanwhile, the championship game the following week (Philadelphia/Arizona) was called by Fred Manfra and Paul Hornung.

References

Sources
1983
1984
1985
USFL Local Announcers

Radio
ABC Radio Sports
Sports radio in the United States